Transtillaspis monoloba is a species of moth of the family Tortricidae. It is found in Peru.

The wingspan is about 19 mm. The ground colour of the forewings is dirty cream preserved as a medio-dorsal blotch. The remaining area is suffused brown. The hindwings are brownish grey.

Etymology
The species name refers to the shape of the transtilla and is derived from Greek monos  (meaning single) and lobos (meaning a lobe).

References

Moths described in 2010
Transtillaspis
Taxa named by Józef Razowski